Kwon Kyung-won (born 31 January 1992) is a South Korean professional footballer who plays as a left-footed centre back or a defensive midfielder for J1 League club Gamba Osaka and the South Korea national team.

Career
He was selected by Jeonbuk Hyundai Motors in the 2010 K-League draft and entered Dong-a University. He joined Jeonbuk before 2013 season starts.

In February 2015, Kwon signed for Al Ahli Dubai on a three-year contract making him the club's designated Asian player.

In January 2017, Kwon signed for Tianjin Tianhai on a five-year contract making him the club's designated Asian player.

On 3 July 2019, Kwon joined Jeonbuk Hyundai Motors on a loan deal until the end of 2019 seaseon.

On 1 January 2022, Kwon signed for J1 League club Gamba Osaka.

International career
In May 2018 he was named in South Korea's preliminary 28 man squad for the 2018 FIFA World Cup in Russia. However, he did not make the final 23.

Club statistics

International goals

Results list South Korea's goal tally first.

Honours 
Al-Ahli
 UAE Pro League: 2015–16
 UAE League Cup: 2016–17
 UAE Super Cup: 2014, 2016

Jeonbuk Hyundai Motors
 K League 1: 2019

South Korea
 EAFF Championship: 2017, 2019

Individual
 AFC Champions League Dream Team: 2015
 UAE Pro League Dream Team: 2015–16
 K League 1 Best XI: 2020

References

External links 
 
 Kwon Kyung-won – National Team Stats at KFA 
 
 
 

1992 births
Living people
Association football midfielders
South Korean footballers
South Korea under-23 international footballers
South Korea international footballers
South Korean expatriate footballers
Jeonbuk Hyundai Motors players
Al Ahli Club (Dubai) players
Tianjin Tianhai F.C. players
Gimcheon Sangmu FC players
Gamba Osaka players
K League 1 players
UAE Pro League players
Chinese Super League players
J1 League players
South Korean expatriate sportspeople in the United Arab Emirates
South Korean expatriate sportspeople in China
Expatriate footballers in the United Arab Emirates
South Korean expatriate sportspeople in Japan
Expatriate footballers in China
Expatriate footballers in Japan
2019 AFC Asian Cup players
Footballers from Seoul
2022 FIFA World Cup players
Dong-a University alumni